Cymindis reitteri is a species of ground beetle in the subfamily Harpalinae. It was described by Liebke in 1927.

References

reitteri
Beetles described in 1927